South Thompson is an unincorporated community in Geauga County, in the U.S. state of Ohio.

History
A post office called South Thompson was established in 1842, and remained in operation until 1905. Besides the post office, South Thompson had a country store.

References

Unincorporated communities in Geauga County, Ohio
Unincorporated communities in Ohio